Bienvenido "Ben" Rivera Santana (born January 11, 1968) is a retired professional baseball pitcher. He played three seasons in Major League Baseball from - for the Philadelphia Phillies and Atlanta Braves. He was a member of the 1993 National League Champion Phillies.

External links

1968 births
Atlanta Braves players
Dominican Republic expatriate baseball players in Japan
Dominican Republic expatriate baseball players in South Korea
Dominican Republic expatriate baseball players in the United States
Hanshin Tigers players
KBO League pitchers

Living people
Major League Baseball pitchers
Major League Baseball players from the Dominican Republic
Nippon Professional Baseball pitchers
Sportspeople from San Pedro de Macorís
Philadelphia Phillies players
Samsung Lions players
Algodoneros de Guasave players
Chinatrust Whales players
Clearwater Phillies players
Diablos Rojos del México players
Dominican Republic expatriate baseball players in Mexico
Dominican Republic expatriate baseball players in Taiwan
Durham Bulls players
Gulf Coast Braves players
Greenville Braves players
Macoto Cobras players
Ottawa Lynx players
Dominican Republic expatriate baseball players in Canada
Rieleros de Aguascalientes players
Scranton/Wilkes-Barre Red Barons players
Sumter Braves players
Vaqueros Laguna players